María Jesús Lampreave Pérez (11 December 1930 – 4 April 2016), known professionally as Chus Lampreave, was a Spanish character actress  who starred in more than 70 films. 
She is internationally known for her roles in films by Pedro Almodóvar.

Biography 
Lampreave was born in Madrid. 
She planned on being a painter and studied at the Real Academia de Bellas Artes de San Fernando, 
after which she worked as an illustrator for the  publishing firm.

It had not been her intention to become an actress, 
but she was discovered by Jaime de Armiñán 
and began appearing in films in 1959. 

Her first work with Pedro Almodóvar was in Entre tinieblas (1983). 
In total, Lampreave appeared in eight of his films. 
Almodóvar is known for his use of recurring female stars; they are referred to as the "Almodóvar girls".

Lampreave was known for playing old ladies, 
usually eccentric female relatives 
that sported extremely thick glasses. 
She was recognized for the humor and humanity she added to her characters.

Lampreave never starred as a main character, 
but would come to be known as Spain's most popular supporting actress.

Lampreave married in 1960. She had a son, who is a biologist, and a daughter who died in the 1990s after an illness. 

Among Lampreave's last roles was as the face of three advertisement campaigns for Campofrío embutido sausages.

She spent the last few years of her life away from the spotlight in Almería in the south of Spain. 
She died in 2016 the age of 85.

Filmography

Television
 Lo+Plus (1997)
Hermanas (1998)

Awards
 Premio Goya (1992)
 Fotogramas de Plata (2005)
 Spanish Actors Union Awards (2006)
 Cannes Film Festival (2006): Best actress together with the rest of female cast of Volver

List of awards and nominations
Cannes Film Festival

Goya Awards

Fotogramas de Plata

Spanish Actors Union Awards

Awards by the Ministry of Culture

 Gold Medal of Merit in the Fine Arts, 2001

References

External links
 

1930 births
2016 deaths
Spanish television actresses
Spanish film actresses
Actresses from Madrid
Best Supporting Actress Goya Award winners
Cannes Film Festival Award for Best Actress winners
Chicas Almodóvar
20th-century Spanish actresses
21st-century Spanish actresses